Golgin A7 is a protein that in humans is encoded by the GOLGA7 gene. 

It is an acylated Golgi protein that interacts with GCP170 protein.

Gene

Transcript

Protein
The protein is 137 amino acids long.

Homologs

References

Further reading